The Nonsuch 36 is a Canadian sailboat, that was designed by Mark Ellis Design and first built in 1983.
The Nonsuch 36 is a development of the Nonsuch 30, which was the first design in the series of Nonsuch sailboats.

Production
The design was built by Hinterhoeller Yachts in Canada. A total of 70 examples of the design were completed before production ended.

Design
The Nonsuch 36 is a small recreational keelboat, built predominantly of fiberglass. It has a cat rig, an unstayed mast with a wishbone boom, a plumb stem, a vertical transom, an internally-mounted spade-type rudder controlled by a wheel and a fixed fin keel. It displaces  and carries  of ballast.

See also
List of sailing boat types

Similar sailboats
Bayfield 36
Beneteau 361
C&C 36-1
C&C 36R
Catalina 36
Columbia 36
Coronado 35
Crealock 37
CS 36
Ericson 36
Frigate 36
Hunter 36
Hunter 36-2
Hunter 36 Legend
Hunter 36 Vision
Invader 36
Islander 36
Portman 36
S2 11.0
Seidelmann 37
Vancouver 36 (Harris)
Watkins 36
Watkins 36C

References

Keelboats
1980s sailboat type designs
Sailing yachts
Sailboat type designs by Mark Ellis
Sailboat types built by Hinterhoeller Yachts